Dr. Joseph Pius O Wamukoya (22 August 1942 – 3 May 2021) was a Kenyan politician, and was, until December 2002 an Assistant Minister in the Kenya African National Union (KANU) government of Daniel arap Moi.

Moi had appointed him assistant minister in the Ministry of Lands and Settlement in June 2001.

References

1942 births
Living people
Kenya African National Union politicians
Party of National Unity (Kenya) politicians
Members of the National Assembly (Kenya)